George Rose (17 June 1744 – 13 January 1818) was a British politician.

Life
Born at Woodside near Brechin, Scotland, Rose was the second son of the Reverend David Rose of Lethnot, of an ancient family of Kilravock, in the County of Nairn, titled Baron of Kilravock by his second wife, Margaret, daughter of Donald Rose of Wester Clune (and a descendant of James Sharp, Archbishop of St Andrews from 1661 to 1679, through his daughter, Isabella). David Rose was said to be the illegitimate son of Hugh Hume-Campbell, 3rd Earl of Marchmont; no illegitimate son is mentioned by Thomas Finlayson Henderson in Marchmont's entry in the Dictionary of National Biography, and George Rose's own entry in that same edition states: 'Later gossip, which made him out a natural son of Lord Marchmont [see Hume, Hugh, third Earl of Marchmont], an apothecary's apprentice, or a purser's clerk, may safely be disregarded'. This indicates the lack of exact detail attached to the claim (as it was in fact George Rose's father David that was said to have been Marchmont's illegitimate son). Nevertheless there was a strong connection with the Marchmonts: Rev. David Rose became tutor to Marchmont's eldest son, Lord Polwarth, and George Rose, on leaving the Royal Navy, was recommended by Marchmont for the position of deputy-chamberlain of the Tally court of the Exchequer, and on Marchmont's death, serving as his sole executor, was bequeathed his library, 'consisting of one of the most curious and valuable collections of manuscripts in Great Britain'. George Rose's son, politician Sir George Henry Rose, published in 1831 'A Selection from the papers of the Earls of Marchmont'. An account of the relationship between the Marchmonts and the Rose family is given in 'The Diaries and Correspondence of the Right Hon. George Rose' (1860), edited by Rev. Leveson Vernon Harcourt.

Owing to his father's poverty, at the age of four years Rose was sent to live with a maternal uncle who ran a school at Hampstead; he was educated for a short time at Westminster School before entering the Royal Navy, a service which he left in 1762 after he had been wounded in some fighting in the West Indies. He then obtained a position in the civil service, becoming joint Keeper of the Records in 1772 and secretary to the Board of Taxes in 1777. In 1782 he gave up the latter appointment to become one of the secretaries to the treasury under Prime Minister Lord Shelburne, though he did not enter Parliament.

He left office with his colleagues in April 1783, but in the following December he returned to his former position at the Treasury in Pitt's ministry, being henceforward one of this minister's most steadfast supporters. He entered Parliament as the Member for Launceston early in 1784, and his fidelity and friendship were rewarded by Pitt, who gave him a lucrative post in the Court of Exchequer; in 1788 he became Clerk of the Parliaments. He was also re-elected to Parliament in 1788 to represent Lymington and again in 1790 to represent Christchurch. In 1801 Rose left office with Pitt, but returned with him to power in 1804, when he was made vice-president of the committee on trade and joint Paymaster-General. He was made a Privy Councillor in January 1802.

Rose resigned these offices a few days after Pitt's death in 1806, but he served as vice-president of the committee on trade and Treasurer of the Navy under the Duke of Portland and Spencer Perceval from 1807 to 1812. In 1807 he was asked to create a new institution, in conjunction with Edward Jenner, to carry out mass vaccinations against smallpox. The National Vaccine Establishment, which is controlled by the Vaccine Board, composed of members of the College of Physicians and the College of Surgeons under the Presidency of Sir Lucas Pepys, was established in 1808.

He was still Treasurer of the Navy under Lord Liverpool and MP for Christchurch, a seat he had held for 28 years, when he died in 1818 at Cuffnells, his house in Lyndhurst, Hampshire. He and many of his family are buried at Christchurch Priory,

Rose was a close friend of Admiral Lord Nelson. He first met Nelson when the latter was a young Captain and had just returned from the West Indies. This friendship grew over the years. Nelson invited Rose to go on board HMS Victory before the ship sailed for the Battle of Trafalgar; his purpose was to tell Rose that, if he was killed, he had left Lady Hamilton and their daughter Horatia to the Nation. Rose was thus the last man in England to see Nelson alive. After Nelson's death Rose became Emma Hamilton's executor and Horatia's guardian; but Pitt's death diminished Rose's influence and his fellow Ministers did not support her.

Rose was also a friend of King George III and his family who stayed with him a number of times at Cuffnells on their way to summer holidays at Weymouth. Rose also owned a seaside house at Sandhills near Christchurch, now a holiday camp.

Rose was a conscientious politician, although he and his two sons drew a large amount of money from sinecures, a fact referred to by William Cobbett in his A New Year's Gift to old George Rose.

Works
Rose wrote several books on economic subjects, and his Diaries and Correspondence, edited by the Rev. L. V. Harcourt, was published in 1860.

Family
In 1769 Rose had married Theodora, the daughter of John Duer of Fulham, Middlesex and Antigua, and with her had two sons and a daughter. Theodora was the sister of Founding Father William Duer.

The elder son, Sir George Henry Rose (1771–1855), was in Parliament from 1794 to 1813, and again from 1818 to 1844, and in the meantime was British minister at Munich, at Berlin, and at Washington. He was made a Knight Grand Cross of the Royal Guelphic Order and in 1818 succeeded his father as Clerk of the Parliaments. He was the father of Field Marshal Baron Strathnairn who was described as one of the bravest men in the British Army and the best commander in the Indian Mutiny.

The second son was the poet William Stewart Rose who was friendly with Sir Walter Scott.

Legacy
The historic Australian town (now suburb of Sydney) of Parramatta was originally called Rose Hill after George Rose, but was later renamed. However, the name Rose Hill was retained by a neighbouring suburb, Rose Hill.

References

 
The Right Honourable George Rose by Peter Poland, published in Sydney, Australia January 1989

External links

 
Parliamentary Archives, Papers of George Rose, MP (1744-1818)

1744 births
1818 deaths
People from Brechin
People educated at Westminster School, London
Members of the Parliament of Great Britain for English constituencies
Members of the Parliament of Great Britain for Launceston
British MPs 1784–1790
British MPs 1790–1796
British MPs 1796–1800
Members of the Parliament of the United Kingdom for English constituencies
UK MPs 1801–1802
UK MPs 1802–1806
UK MPs 1806–1807
UK MPs 1807–1812
UK MPs 1812–1818
Paymasters of the Forces
Members of the Privy Council of the United Kingdom
Clan Rose